Mohamed Khoudary (born 4 April  2002) is an Egyptian professional footballer who plays as a midfielder for Egyptian Premier League club Zamalek.

References

Egyptian footballers
Living people
2002 births
Zamalek SC players